Ballyjamesduff is a town in County Cavan, Ireland. A former market town, it was the winner of the 1966 and 1967 Irish Tidy Towns Competition.

History
The first mention of Ballyjamesduff is found in The Registry of Deeds, Kings Inns, Henrietta Street, Dublin, Deed No.12-294-5122, drawn up on 12 May 1714.

In A Topographical Dictionary of Ireland, first published by Samuel Lewis in 1837, its entry reads:
"Ballyjamesduff, an old market town, in county Cavan, and the province of Ulster. The town is situated on the old mail-coach road from Virginia to Cavan.The parish was created in 1831, by disuniting nine townlands from the parish of Castleraghan, five from that of Denn, two from Lurgan, and four from the parish of Kildrumferton."''

Demographics
The population was 2,661 at the 2016 census. At that census, Ballyjamesduff had a similar population to the County Cavan towns of Bailieborough, Virginia and Kingscourt: each with about 2,500 people. The town's population is diverse, with about 35% born outside of Ireland.

Transport

The town is located on the R194 and R196 regional roads.

Bus Éireann Route 187 provides service to Oldcastle, Mountnugent, Virginia and Kells.

Notable places in Ballyjamesduff
 Cavan County Museum, located in the former Convent of St Clare, the Museum collects, conserves and displays the material heritage and culture of County Cavan, over its 6000-year history. In August 2014, Cavan County Museum opened Ireland's largest outdoor WW1 replica trench.
 Ballyjamesduff was once noted for having the largest pub to person ratio in Ireland. There was approximately 1 pub for every 34 persons in the town.
 The Market House, built in 1815 to commemorate the military achievements at Waterloo of the Duke of Wellington, was designed by Arthur McClean a Cavan-born architect who also designed the Anglican church in Virginia, County Cavan. McClean left Ireland around 1825 and settled in Brockville, Ontario, Canada where he built a number of Anglican churches.
 St Joseph's Town Hall was built in 1959 and was opened officially in 1968 by showband act Big Tom and The Mainliners.
 Liffey Meats, a meat processing plant, which gained notoriety when it was revealed they processed equine and porcine meat in beefburgers.

Popular culture

"The Frolics"

	
Ballyjamesduff annually holds "The Frolics", a music and comedy event.

In song

Ballyjamesduff is referenced in the Percy French song "Come back Paddy Reilly to Ballyjamesduff", which was written about a man from the area who acted as jarvy (coach driver) for French and decided to emigrate to Scotland. It is said that he drove his horse and cart to Carrick-on-Shannon, parked the horse and cart outside the railway station and took the train to Dublin. Paddy Reilly is supposedly buried in St Joseph's graveyard in the town of Ballyjamesduff.

Pork Festival
The Pork Festival was an annual town festival started in 1994. This was largely due to a nearby pork-rendering factory supplying a large amount of pork for use in the festival.

People

 Percy French, poet, songwriter and former Board of Works Inspector of Drains with Cavan County Council.
 John Wesley, preacher, theologian and founder of the worldwide Methodist Church, preached in Ballyjamesduff and built a church here in the 18th century.  
 Pete Briquette (born Patrick Cusack), bassist with the Boomtown Rats came from Ballyjamesduff.
 Marcus Daly, known as "the Montana Copper King", was born in 1841 near Ballyjamesduff.
 Ronan Lee, author, academic, and former Member of Parliament for Indooroopilly electorate, Queensland, Australia came from Ballyjamesduff.

See also
 2013 meat adulteration scandal
 List of towns and villages in Ireland
 Market Houses in Ireland

References

External links

 
Towns and villages in County Cavan